Forte La Rocca Lighthouse is an active lighthouse located next to the tip of the promontory of the Argentario on the Tyrrhenian Sea.

Description
The tower is covered by white mosaic tails made of wind and salt resistant material; the lantern dome is grey metallic. The lighthouse is completely automated and managed by the Marina Militare with the identification code number 2172 E.F.

See also
 List of lighthouses in Italy

References

External links

 Servizio Fari Marina Militare

Lighthouses in Tuscany
Buildings and structures in the Province of Grosseto
Lighthouses completed in 1862
1862 establishments in Italy
Monte Argentario
Lighthouses in Italy